Survant is an unincorporated community in Marion Township, Pike County, in the U.S. state of Indiana.

History
A post office was established at Survant in 1883, and remained in operation until it was discontinued in 1903. George T. Survant served as an early postmaster.

Geography

References

Unincorporated communities in Pike County, Indiana
Unincorporated communities in Indiana